Jeffrey Todd Bridewell (born May 13, 1967) is a former American football quarterback who was drafted in the 12th round of the 1991 NFL Draft by the Phoenix Cardinals of the National Football League (NFL). He had brief stints with the Green Bay Packers, Indianapolis Colts, San Francisco 49ers, and with the Sacramento Surge, Barcelona Dragons, and Frankfurt Galaxy of the World League. He played college football for UC Davis.

Early life and high school career 
Bridewell was born in Napa, California, where he played high school football for Vintage High School.

College career 
Bridewell played college football for the UC Davis Aggies. In his time there he passed for 5,733 yards and 34 touchdowns. He was selected to participate in the King All-America Classic following his senior year, along with receiving an invite to the NFL Scouting Combine. He finished as the school's all-time leader in completions.

Professional career

Phoenix Cardinals 
In 1991, Bridewell was drafted by the Phoenix Cardinals in the 12th round of the 1991 NFL Draft but did not make the final roster.

Green Bay Packers 
In 1991, Bridewell signed with the Green Bay Packers' practice squad, never making it to the team's active roster.

Indianapolis Colts 
In 1992, Bridewell signed with the Indianapolis Colts.

Sacramento Surge 
With the Colts Bridewell was allocated to the Sacramento Surge of the World League.

Frankfurt Galaxy 
Bridewell was traded to the Barcelona Dragons and then to the Frankfurt Galaxy.

San Francisco 49ers 
In 1993, Bridewell signed with the San Francisco 49ers but was released. After Steve Young suffered an injury to his throwing hand he resigned with the team. He would not play a down for the team.

References 

Living people
1968 births
Green Bay Packers players
Indianapolis Colts players
Arizona Cardinals players
San Francisco 49ers players
Sacramento Surge players
Barcelona Dragons players
Frankfurt Galaxy players
UC Davis Aggies football players
American football quarterbacks
Players of American football from California
People from Napa, California